= One sharp =

One sharp may refer to:

- G major, a major musical key with one sharp
- E minor, a minor musical key with one sharp
